John Boyne (born 30 April 1971) is an Irish novelist. He is the author of fourteen novels for adults, six novels for younger readers, two novellas and one collection of short stories. His novels are published in over 50 languages.  His 2006 novel The Boy in the Striped Pyjamas was adapted into a 2008 film of the same name.

Biography
Boyne was born in Dublin, where he still lives to this day. His first short story was published by the Sunday Tribune and in 1993 was shortlisted for a Hennessy Literary Award. His B.A degree is from Trinity College Dublin in English in 1993, and he subsequently obtained an MA degree from the University of East Anglia. In 2015 he was awarded an Honorary Doctorate of Letters from the University of East Anglia. He chaired the jury for the 2015 Scotiabank Giller Prize.

Boyne is gay, and has spoken about the difficulties he encountered growing up gay in Catholic Ireland. Boyne has spoken of suffering abuse in Terenure College as a student there.

He regards John Banville as "the world's greatest living writer".

In August 2020, it was noticed that Boyne's latest novel, A Traveller at the Gates of Wisdom, which takes place in the real world in the year 1 AD, contained a section in which a seamstress refers to the ingredients used to create dyes. However, the listed ingredients were entirely fictional, being taken from the 2017 videogame The Legend of Zelda: Breath of the Wild, and included items such as the "silent princess" flower, "octorok eyeballs", and "the tail of the red lizalfos". The error was initially posted on Reddit, and after writer Dana Schwartz highlighted the segment on Twitter, theorizing that Boyne had done an Internet search for 'how to dye clothes red' and used the Zelda results without looking into the context, Boyne admitted his error, saying "I’ll leave it as it is. I actually think it’s quite funny and you’re totally right. I don’t remember but I must have just Googled it. Hey, sometimes you just gotta throw your hands up and say ‘yup! My bad!’"

The Boy in the Striped Pyjamas 

The Boy in the Striped Pyjamas was published in 2006. The book has sold over seven million copies worldwide. A Heyday/Miramax film adaptation, The Boy in the Striped Pyjamas, was shot in Budapest in mid-2007 and released in late 2008. Directed by Mark Herman, the film stars Asa Butterfield, David Thewlis, Vera Farmiga, Rupert Friend and Sheila Hancock. In January 2020, the book was cited by the Auschwitz-Birkenau State Museum, in a set of back and forth tweets between the museum and the author, as a book that should be avoided by those promoting accurate understanding of the Holocaust. In response, Boyne suggested that the Museum's criticism contained inaccurate information.

Controversy 
Boyne's 2019 book My Brother's Name is Jessica, about a young boy coming to terms with his older sibling coming out as a trans girl, was criticised over its portrayal of transgender topics and for misgendering people. In an article in The Irish Times promoting the book, Boyne explained that he was inspired to write it by a transgender friend of his, and had spoken to gender-identity professionals and "several trans people" to ensure he portrayed the book's subject matter authentically. However, he received further criticism for stating in the article that "I reject the word 'cis'... I don’t consider myself a cis man; I consider myself a man." He added that "while I will happily employ any term that a person feels best defines them... I reject the notion that someone can force an unwanted term on to another".

Writing in response to Boyne in The Irish Times, Aoife Martin, director of the Trans Equality Network Ireland, asserted that "whether Boyne likes it or not, he is a cis man and he has cis privilege", and stated that "I haven’t read his new book". Boyne deleted his Twitter account, claiming social media harassment, though he would later rejoin the site. Some writers have supported him.

Selected works

Novels 
2000: The Thief of Time (Weidenfeld & Nicolson)
2001: The Congress of Rough Riders (Weidenfeld & Nicolson)
2004: Crippen (Penguin)
2006: Next of Kin (Penguin)
2008: Mutiny on the Bounty (Doubleday)
2009: The House of Special Purpose (Doubleday)
2011: The Absolutist (Doubleday)
2013: This House Is Haunted (Doubleday)
2014: A History of Loneliness (Doubleday)
2017: The Heart's Invisible Furies (Doubleday)
2018: A Ladder To The Sky (Doubleday) 
2020: A Traveler at the Gates of Wisdom (Doubleday)
2021: The Echo Chamber (Doubleday) 
2022: All the Broken Places (Doubleday)

Novels for younger readers 
2006: The Boy in the Striped Pyjamas (David Fickling Books) 
2010: Noah Barleywater Runs Away (David Fickling Books)
2012: The Terrible Thing That Happened To Barnaby Brocket (Doubleday Children's)
2013: Stay Where You Are And Then Leave (Doubleday Children's)
2015: The Boy at the Top of the Mountain (Doubleday Children's)
2019: My Brother's Name is Jessica (Puffin)

Novellas 
2008: The Second Child (New Island Books) 
2009: The Dare (Black Swan Books)

Short story collections 
2015: Beneath The Earth (Doubleday)

Awards
 The Boy in the Striped Pyjamas: winner: Irish Book Awards Children's Book of the Year; Irish Book Awards Radio 1 Book of the Year; Qué Leer Award Best International Novel of the Year (Spain); Orange Prize Readers Group: Book of the Year; Children's Books Ireland Book of the Year. Shortlist: Irish Book Award Novel of the Year; British Book Award; the Border's New Voices Award; the Ottar's Children's Book Prize; the Paolo Ungari Literary Award (Italy); Deutscher Jugendliteraturpreis (Germany). Longlist: The Carnegie Medal; the International IMPAC Literary Award
 Noah Barleywater Runs Away: shortlisted for Irish Book Awards Children's Book of the Year; Sheffield Children's Book Award, Hull Children's Book Award; Longlist: The Carnegie Medal
 The Terrible Thing That Happened to Barnaby Brocket: shortlisted for Irish Book Awards: Children's Book of the Year; Longlist: The Carnegie Medal
 The Absolutist: Longlist: International Dublin Literary Award
 Stay Where You Are And Then Leave: shortlisted for Irish Book Awards Children's Book of the Year; Deutscher Jugendliteraturpreis (Germany)
 A History of Loneliness: shortlisted for Irish Book Awards Novel of the Year
 The Boy At The Top Of The Mountain: shortlisted for Irish Book Awards Children's Book of the Year; Children's Books Ireland Book of the Year
 The Heart's Invisible Furies: shortlisted for Irish Book Awards Novel of the Year
 The 'Invisible Furies": 2017 Book of the Year for Book of the Month
 A Ladder to the Sky: shortlisted for Irish Book Awards Novel of the Year; Kerry Group Irish Novel of the Year Award
Other Awards:
 2012: Hennessy Literary Award Hall of Fame
 2014: Winner: Irish Book Awards: Short Story of the Year ('Rest Day')
 2015: Shortlist: Irish Book Awards: Short Story of the Year ('Boy, 19')
 2015: Gustav Heinemann Peace Prize (Germany)

References

External links

 
 John Boyne page at Amazon.
 Interview
 Boyne at Irish Writers Directory 
 Boyne at Irish Writers Online, "a concise dictionary".
 Review of This House is Haunted at Upcoming4.me "literary magazine", October 2013.
 
 

1971 births
Living people
Alumni of Trinity College Dublin
Alumni of the University of East Anglia
Irish historical novelists
Irish children's writers
Irish male novelists
21st-century Irish novelists
21st-century Irish male writers
Irish LGBT novelists
Irish gay writers